This is a list of all the episodes of Adventures in Odyssey, a Christian animated radio drama series produced by Focus on the Family. It has aired on the radio since its debut on November 21, 1987, and has been one of the longest-running radio programs still in production. Almost all the episodes, sorted into a series of albums, have been available, originally on cassette tape, but also on CD, digital download, and through Focus on the Family's online subscription service, the Adventures in Odyssey Club.

Series overview

Episodes

Season 1 (1987–88)
Episodes 1-19 were originally aired under the name "Odyssey USA".

7: "Promises, Promises"
8: "Dental Dilemma"
9: "Doing Unto Others"
10: "Nothing to Fear"
11: "Addictions Can Be Habit-Forming"
12: "The Tangled Web"
13: "Bobby's Valentine"
14: "Missed It By That Much"
15: "My Brother's Keeper"
16: "No Stupid Questions"
17: "A Member of the Family, Part 1"
18: "A Member of the Family, Part 2"
19: "Recollections"
End of Odyssey USA title
20: "Mike Makes Right"
21: "The Case of the Missing Train Car"
22: "A Simple Addition"
Start of Adventures in Odyssey title
23: "The Quality of Mercy"
24: "Gotcha!"
25: "Harley Takes the Case, Part 1"
26: "Harley Takes the Case, Part 2"
27: "A Change of Hart"
28: "The Price of Freedom"
29: "Rumor Has It"
30: "Honor Thy Parents"
31: "Family Vacation, Part 1"
32: "Family Vacation, Part 2"
33: "The Day Independence Came"
34: "Stormy Weather"
35: "VBS Blues"
36: "Kid's Radio"
37: "Camp What-a-Nut, Part 1"
38: "Camp What-a-Nut, Part 2"
39: "The Case of the Secret Room, Part 1"
40: "The Case of the Secret Room, Part 2"
41: "Return to the Bible Room"
42: "The Last Great Adventure of the Summer"
43: "Back to School"
44: "It Sure Seemed Like It To Me"
45: "What Are We Gona Do About Halloween?"
46: "The Shepherd and the Giant"
47: "A Single Vote"
48: "Heroes"
49: "Thank You, God"
50: "Karen"
51: "Connie, Part 1"
52: "Connie, Part 2"
53: "The Sacred Trust"
54: "Peace On Earth"
55: "Auld Lang Syne"

Season 2 (1989)
56: "By Faith, Noah"
57: "The Prodigal, Jimmy"
58: "A Matter of Obedience"
59: "A Worker Approved"
60: "And When You Pray . . ."
61: "The Boy Who Didn't Go to Church"
62: "Let This Mind Be in You"
63: "A Good and Faithful Servant"
64: "The Greatest of These"
65: "Bad Company"
66: "The Imagination Station, Part 1"
67: "The Imagination Station, Part 2"
68: "Choices"
69: "Go Ye Therefore"
70: "The Return of Harley, Part 1" (Withdrawn from use) (remade as episode 255)
71: "The Return of Harley, Part 2" (Withdrawn from use) (remade as episode 255)
72: "An Encounter with Mrs. Hooper"
73: "A Bite of Applesauce"
74: "Connie Goes to Camp, Part 1"
75: "Connie Goes to Camp, Part 2"
76: "Eugene's Dilemma"
77: "The Nemesis, Part 1"
78: "The Nemesis, Part 2"
79: "Our Best Vacation Ever"
80: "A Prisoner for Christ"
81: "Good Business"
82: "Heatwave"
83: "The Battle, Part 1"
84: "The Battle, Part 2"
85: "You Go to School Where?"
86: "Isaac the Insecure"
87: "Elijah, Part 1"
88: "Elijah, Part 2"
89: "That's Not Fair"
90: "But, You Promised"
91: "A Mission for Jimmy"
92: "The Ill-Gotten Deed"
93: "Rescue from Manatugo Point"
94: "Operation: Dig Out"
95: "The Very Best of Friends"
96: "The Reluctant Rival"
97: "Monty's Christmas"
98: "The Visitors"
99: "The Barclay Family Ski Vacation"

Season 3 (1990)
100: "Ice Fishing"
101: "Scattered Seeds"
102: "The Treasure of LeMonde!"
103: "Front Page News"
104: "Lincoln, Part 1"
105: "Lincoln, Part 2"
106: "By Any Other Name"
107: "Bad Luck"
108: "Isaac the Courageous"
109: "Two Sides to Every Story"
110: "A . . . is for Attitude"
111: "First Love"
112: "Curious, Isn't It?"
113: "Suspicious Minds"
114: "The Big Broadcast"
115: "An Act of Mercy" (remake)
116: "Isaac the Benevolent" (remake)
117: "The Trouble with Girls" (remake)
118: "What Happened to the Silver Streak?" (remake)
119: "Better Late Than Never" (remake)
120: "Pranks for the Memories" (remake)
121: "Missing Person" (remake)
122: "Castles & Cauldrons, Part 1" (Introduction by Dr. James Dobson)
123: "Castles & Cauldrons, Part 2" (Introduction by Dr. James Dobson)
124: "The Winning Edge"
125: "All's Well with Boswell"
126: "Wishful Thinking"
127: "Have You No Selpurcs?"
128: "One Bad Apple"
129: "Not One of Us"
130: "Bernard & Joseph, Part 1"
131: "Bernard & Joseph, Part 2"
132: "Thanksgiving at Home"
133: "Cousin Albert"
134: "Pamela Has a Problem"
135: "Back to Bethlehem, Part 1"
136: "Back to Bethlehem, Part 2"
137: "Back to Bethlehem, Part 3"
138: "The Adventure of the Adventure" (Behind the scenes episode)

Season 4 (1991)
139: "Melanie's Diary"
140: "The Vow"
141: "Over the Airways"
142: "Train Ride"
143: "Muckraker"
144: "Someone to Watch Over Me"
145: "The Second Coming"
146: "Emotional Baggage"
147: "Where There's a Will . . ."
148: "Isaac the Procrastinator"
149: "By Dawn's Early Light"
150: "Home Is Where the Hurt Is"
151: ". . . The Last Shall Be First"
152: "The Meaning of Sacrifice"
153: "Mayor for a Day"
154: "Coming of Age"
155: "Waylaid in the Windy City, Part 1"
156: "Waylaid in the Windy City, Part 2"
157: "Last in a Long Line"
158: "A Day in the Life"
159: "The Homecoming"
160: "A Rathbone of Contention"
161: "Isaac the True Friend"
162: "Peacemaker"
163: "A Model Child"
164: "Sixties-Something"
165: "Bernard & Esther, Part 1"
166: "Bernard & Esther, Part 2"
167: "Dobson Comes to Town" (This was related to the launch of the then-new Adventures in Odyssey video series.)
168: "The Curse"
169: "Hold Up!"
170: "A Test for Robyn"
171: "The Cross of Cortes, Part 1"
172: "The Cross of Cortes, Part 2"
173: "A Thanksgiving Carol"
174: "Where's Your Daddy?"
175: "East Winds, Raining"
176: "The Star, Part 1"
177: "The Star, Part 2"
178: "Room Mates"

Season 5 (1992)
179: "You Gotta Be Wise"
180: "Isaac the Pure"
181: "It Takes Integrity"
182: "The Scales of Justice"
183: "Tales of Moderation"
184: "Isaac the Chivalrous"
185: "A Question of Loyalty"
186: "The Conscientious Cross-Guard"
187: "An Act of Nobility"
188: "The Courage to Stand"
189: "No, Honestly!"
190: "Moses, the Passover, Part 1"
191: "Moses, the Passover, Part 2"
192: "Modesty is the Best Policy"
193: "A Tongue of Fire"
194: "A License to Drive"
195: "Father's Day"
196: "Harlow Doyle, Private Eye"
197: "The Midnight Ride"
198: "Treasure Hunt"
199: "The 'No' Factor"
200: "Feud for Thought"
201: "Fair-Weather Fans"
202: "Timmy's Cabin"
203: "Double Trouble"
204: "Wonderworld"
205: "Flash Flood"
206: "Pen Pal"
207: "The Case of the Candid Camera"
208: "Pipe Dreams"
209: "Columbus: The Grand Voyage"
210: "On Solid Ground"
211: "The Mortal Coil, Part 1"
212: "The Mortal Coil, Part 2"
213: "Best Intentions"
214: "The Living Nativity"
215: "Caroling, Caroling"
216: "Like Father, Like Son"

Season 6 (1993)
217: "Rights, Wrongs, & Reasons"
218: "A Class Act"
219: "Treasures of the Heart"
220: "This Is Chad Pearson?"
221: "It Is Well"
222: "The Jesus Cloth"
223: "Real Time"
224: "Greater Love"
225: "Count It All Joy"
226: "An Adventure in Bethany, Part 1"
227: "An Adventure in Bethany, Part 2"
228: "A Game of Compassion"
229: "The Marriage Feast"
230: "Our Father"
231: "Hallowed Be Thy Name"
232: "Thy Kingdom Come"
233: "Thy Will Be Done"
234: "Our Daily Bread"
235: "Forgive Us as We Forgive"
236: "Into Temptation"
237: "Deliver Us from Evil"
238: "For Thine Is the Kingdom"
239: "The Power"
240: "And the Glory"
241: "Forever...Amen"
242: "Hymn Writers"
243: "Family Values"
244: "The Mysterious Stranger, Part 1"
245: "The Mysterious Stranger, Part 2"
246: "My Fair Bernard"
247: "Why Don't You Grow Up?"
248: "Terror from the Skies"
249: "The Case of the Delinquent Disciples"
250: "Pilgrim's Progress Revisited, Part 1"
251: "Pilgrim's Progress Revisited, Part 2"
252: "The Bad Hair Day"
253: "A Time for Christmas"

Season 7 (1994)
254: "Truth, Trivia, & 'Trina"
255: "The Boy who Cried 'Destructo!"' (remake)
256: "Aloha, Oy!, Part 1"
257: "Aloha, Oy!, Part 2"
258: "Aloha, Oy!, Part 3"
259: "The Potential in Elliot"
260: "Naturally, I Assumed"
261: "Afraid, Not!"
262: "A Prayer for George Barclay"
263: "When Bad Isn't So Good"
264: "Making the Grade"
265: "War of the Words"
266: "It Began with a Rabbit's Foot . . ." (Part 1)
267: ". . . It Ended with a Handshake" (Part 2)
268: "Pet Peeves"
269: "Fences"
270: "The War Hero"
271: "The Secret Keys of Discipline"
272: "Two Brothers . . . and Bernard, Part 1"
273: "Two Brothers . . . and Bernard, Part 2"
274: "First-Hand Experience"
275: "Second Thoughts"
276: "Third Degree"
277: "It Happened at Four Corners"
278: "The Fifth House on the Left, Part 1"
279: "The Fifth House on the Left, Part 2"
280: "Gone . . ." (Part 1)
281: ". . . But Not Forgotten" (Part 2)
282: "The Fundamentals"
283: "A Book By Its Cover"
284: "The Election Deception"
285: "George Under Pressure"
286: "Tom for Mayor, Part 1"
287: "Tom for Mayor, Part 2"
288: "The Twilife Zone"
289: "A Call for Reverend Jimmy"
290: "A Name, Not a Number, Part 1"
291: "A Name, Not a Number, Part 2"
292: "Siege at Jericho"
293: "A Code of Honor"
294: "Unto Us a Child is Born"
295: "Soaplessly Devoted"

Season 8 (1995)
296: "Red Wagons and Pink Flamingos"
297: "Blackbeard's Treasure"
298: "I Want My B-TV!"
299: "The Truth About Zachary"
300: "Preacher's Kid"
301: "The Good, the Bad, & Butch"
302: "Share & Share Alike"
303: "All the Difference in the World"
304: "St. Paul: The Man from Tarsus"
305: "St. Paul: Set Apart by God"
306: "A Victim of Circumstance" 
307: "Poetry in Slow Motion"
308: "Subject Yourself"
309: "The Perfect Witness, Part 1"
310: "The Perfect Witness, Part 2"
311: "The Perfect Witness, Part 3"
312: "Rewards in Full"
313: "Top This!"
314: "The Underground Railroad, Part 1"
315: "The Underground Railroad, Part 2"
316: "The Underground Railroad, Part 3"
317: "BTV: Envy"
318: "A Touch of Healing, Part 1"
319: "A Touch of Healing, Part 2"
320: "Where is Thy Sting?"
321: "Hidden in My Heart"
322: "The Turning Point"
323: "A Little Credit, Please"
324: "Small Fires, Little Pools"
325: "Angels Unaware"
326: "Gathering Thunder"
327: "Moving Targets"
328: "Hard Losses"
329: "The Return"
330: "The Time Has Come"
331: "Checkmate"
332: "Another Chance"
333: "The Last Resort"
334: "The Final Conflict"
335: "Love is in the Air, Part 1"
336: "Love is in the Air, Part 2"
337: "W-O-R-R-Y"
338: "Easy Money"
339: "Do, for a Change"

Season 9 (1996)
340: "Pokenberry Falls, R.F.D., Part 1"
341: "Pokenberry Falls, R.F.D., Part 2"
342: "Welcome Home, Mr. Blackgaard"
343: "The Pretty Good Samaritan"
344: "Letting Go"
345: "BTV: Compassion"
346: "St. Paul: Voyage to Rome"
347: "St. Paul: An Appointment with Caesar"
348: "With a Little Help from My Friends"
349: "Blessings in Disguise"
350: "The Time of Our Lives"
351: "What Are You Gonna Do with Your Life?"
352: "Memories of Jerry"
353: "A Question About Tasha"
354: "Blind Justice"
355: "The Search for Whit, Part 1"
356: "The Search for Whit, Part 2"
357: "The Search for Whit, Part 3"
358: "The Secret Weapon"
359: "The Merchant of Odyssey"
360: "Three Funerals and a Wedding, Part 1"
361: "Three Funerals and a Wedding, Part 2"
362: "The Right Choice, Part 1"
363: "The Right Choice, Part 2"
364: "Home, Sweet Home"
365: "Clara"
366: "Solitary Refinement"
367: "The Decision"
368: "The Other Woman"
369: "It's a Wrap!"
370: "Christmas Around the World, Part 1"
371: "Christmas Around the World, Part 2"

At the end of the 1996 season, the AIO team took a nine-month break, with no new episodes until September 1997.  According to the "Adventures in Odyssey HQ" website, "the hiatus" means the time from December 1996 to September 1997 where no episodes were produced.  The writers, producers, actors, and production engineers needed a break from the daily pressure of the program and after ten years of production decided it was time. Many things have changed from "old Odyssey" before the hiatus to "new Odyssey" after the hiatus.  None of the children (unless you count Rodney Rathbone) from old Odyssey have been carried over to new Odyssey.  Nearly all of the storylines from old Odyssey were finished off in the final album of that era (Welcome Home) and the show has in general had a different "flavor" than before."

Season 10 (1997–98)
372: "For Whom the Wedding Bells Toll, Part 1"
373: "For Whom the Wedding Bells Toll, Part 2"
374: "For Whom the Wedding Bells Toll, Part 3"
375: "The Pushover"
376: "Chores No More"
377: "Just Say Yes"
378: "The Painting"
379: "Best Face Forward"
380: "The One About Trust, Part 1"
381: "The One About Trust, Part 2"
382: "Viva La Difference"
383: "BTV: Thanks"
384: "Amazing Grace"
385: "It's a Pokenberry Christmas, Part 1"
386: "It's a Pokenberry Christmas, Part 2"
387: "New Year's Eve Live!" (This episode was recorded before a live audience at Focus on the Family Headquarters.)
388: "Leap of Faith"
389: "O.T. Action News: Jephthah's Vow"
390: "No Bones About It"
391: "The Jokes On You"
392: "When In Doubt . . . Pray!"
393: "Wrapped Around Your Finger"
394: "Patrick: A Heart Afire, Part 1"
395: "Patrick: A Heart Afire, Part 2"
396: "Poor Loser"
397: "Tornado!"
398: "A Case of Revenge"
399: "Bernard and Job"
400: "The Spy Who Bugged Me"
401: "More Like Alicia"
402: "Arizona Sunrise"
403: "Faster Than a Speeding Ticket"
404: "Hide and Seek"
405: "The Graduate"

Season 11 (1998–99)
406: "Malachi's Message, Part 1"
407: "Malachi's Message, Part 2"
408: "Malachi's Message, Part 3"
409: "Natural Born Leader"
410: "BTV: Forgiveness"
411: "In All Things Give Thanks"
412: "A Lesson From Mike"
413: "The Devil Made Me Do It"
414: "Buried Sin"
415: "Gloobers!"
416: "The Tower"
417: "Not-So-Trivial Pursuit"
418: "Opening Day"
419: "Another Man's Shoes"
420: "Telemachus, Part 1"
421: "Telemachus, Part 2"

Season 12 (1999–2000)
During this season, the series experimented with a "split-episode" format for some episodes. The concept was not particularly popular and the format was ultimately discontinued.

422: "Passages, Part 1"
423: "Passages, Part 2"
424: "Blackgaard's Revenge, Part 1"
425: "Blackgaard's Revenge, Part 2"
426: "The Buck Starts Here"
427: "Something Cliqued Between Us"
428a: "The Eternal Birthday"
428b: "Bethany's Imaginary Friend"
429: "The YAK Problem"
430: "Blind Girl's Bluff"
431a: "Where There's Smoke"
431b: "The Virtual Kid"
432: "You Win Some, You Lose Some"
433a: "The Treasure Room"
433b: "Chain Reaction"
434: "BTV: Redeeming the Season"
435: "A Look Back, Part 1" (Behind the scenes episode)
436: "A Look Back, Part 2" (Behind the scenes episode)
437a: "Sunset Bowlawater"
437b: "The Long Way Home"
438a: "The Lyin' Tale"
438b: "The Telltale Cat"
439: "BTV: Grace"
440: "I Slap Floor"
441a: "What Do You Think?"
441b: "Idol Minds"
442a: "Two Roads"
442b: "Sticks and Stones"
443: "Changing Rodney"
444a: "Career Moves"
444b: "The Bad Guy"
445: "No Boundaries"
446a: "A Matter of Manners"
446b: "The Seven Deadly Dwarves"
447: "Potlucks and Poetry"
448: "Mandy's Debut" (This episode was recorded before a live audience at the National Religious Broadcasters' Convention.)
--- (a.k.a. 444c): "Bethany's Flood" (This episode was not aired. Instead, it went straight to In Your Wildest Dreams.)

Season 13 (2000–01)
449: "The Big Deal, Part 1"
450: "The Big Deal, Part 2"
451: "Life Trials of the Rich and Famous"
452: "Missionary: Impossible"
453: "The Great Wishy Woz, Part 1"
454: "The Great Wishy Woz, Part 2"
455: "Best Laid Plans"
456: "Worst Day Ever"
457: "Opportunity Knocks"
458: "Red Herring"
459: "Slumber Party"
460: "Nova Rising"
461: "BTV: Obedience"
462: "The W.E."
463: "Green Eyes and Yellow Tulips"
464: "The Triangle, Part 1"
465: "The Triangle, Part 2"
466: "Snow Day"
467: "Broken Window"
468: "Chains, Part 1"
469: "Chains, Part 2"
470: "Break a Leg"
471: "Fifteen Minutes"
472: "Welcoming Wooton"
473: "Breaking Point"

Season 14 (2001–02)
474: "Shining Armor, Part 1"
475: "Shining Armor, Part 2"
476: "Relatively Annoying"
477: "O.T. Action News: Battle at the Kishon"
478: "Strange Boy in a Strange Land"
479: "Happy Smilers"
480: "The Popsicle Kid"
481: "Grand Opening, Part 1"
482: "Grand Opening, Part 2"
483: "Secrets"
484: "Plan B, Part 1 -- Missing in Action"
485: "Plan B, Part 2 -- Collision Course"
486: "Plan B, Part 3 -- Crossfire"
487: "Plan B, Part 4 -- Resistance"
488: "Under the Influence, Part 1"
489: "Under the Influence, Part 2"
490: "The Black Veil, Part 1"
491: "The Black Veil, Part 2"
492: "Twisting Pathway"
493: "Sheep's Clothing"
494: "Box of Miracles"
495: "The Unraveling"
496: "Exceptional Circumstances"
497: "Expect the Worst"
498: "Exactly as Planned"
499: "Exit"
500: "500" (Behind the scenes episode)

Season 15 (2002–03)
501: "Inside the Studio" (Behind the scenes episode)
502: "Live at the 25" (This episode was recorded before a live audience at Focus on the Family Headquarters.)
503: "Between You and Me"
504: "Aubrey's Bathrobe"
505: "The Toy Man"
506: "For Trying Out Loud"
507: "The Benefit of the Doubt"
508: "The American Revelation, Part 1"
509: "The American Revelation, Part 2"
510: "For the Fun of It"
511: "The Pact, Part 1"
512: "The Pact, Part 2"
513: "Do or Diet"
514: "Room Enough for Two"
515: "BTV: Behind the Scenes"
516: "Bassett Hounds"
517: "It's All About Me"
518: "The Case of the Disappearing Hortons"
519: "The Defining Moment"
520: "The Mystery at Tin Flat"
521: "Hindsight"
522: "All Things to All People"
523: "Here Today, Gone Tomorrow?, Part 1"
524: "Here Today, Gone Tomorrow?, Part 2"
525: "Here Today, Gone Tomorrow?, Part 3"

Season 16 (2003–04)
526: "Seeing Red"
527: "Black Clouds"
528: "The Taming of the Two"
529: "The Mailman Cometh"
530: "Silver Lining"
531: "Teacher's Pest"
532: "Pink is Not My Color"
533: "Something Blue, Part 1"
534: "Something Blue, Part 2"
535: "Living in the Gray, Part 1"
536: "Living in the Gray, Part 2"
537: "My Girl Hallie" (This episode has an alternate ending. The producers posted both endings online for a fans' vote, with the winner making it into the finished show.)
538: "Stubborn Streaks"
539: "Called on in Class"
540: "The Girl in the Sink"
541: "Bernard & Saul"
542: "Eggshells"
543: "Nothing But the Half Truth"
544: "Split Ends"
545: "Something's Got to Change"
546: "No Way Out (Part 1)"
547: "No Way In (Part 2)"

Season 17 (2004–05)
548: "Sounds Like a Mystery"
549: "Think on These Things"
550: "Fairy Tal-e-vision"
551: "Stars in Our Eyes"
552: "Sunday Morning Scramble"
553: "Potential Possibilities"
554: "Call Me if You Care"
555: "True Calling"
556: "...And That's the Truth"
557: "A Lamb's Tale"
558: "A Glass Darkly"
559: "The Coolest Dog"
560: "The Present Long Ago"
561: "Lost by a Nose"
562: "The Last "I Do""
563: "Tuesdays With Wooton"
564: "A Most Intriguing Question"
565: "A Most Surprising Answer"
566: "A Most Extraordinary Conclusion"
567: "Two Friends and a Truck"
568: "The Power of One"
569: "The Invisible Dog"
570: "For Better or for Worse, Part 1"
571: "For Better or for Worse, Part 2"
572: "Odyssey Sings!"

Season 18 (2005–06)
573: "Back to Abnormal"
574: "Prisoners of Fear, Part 1"
575: "Prisoners of Fear, Part 2"
576: "Prisoners of Fear, Part 3"
577: "The Business of Busyness"
578: "All-Star Witness"
579: "Always"
580: "Tales of a Small-Town Thug"
581: "A Christmas Conundrum"
582: "Silent Night"
583: "The Champ of the Camp"
584: "Dead Ends"
585: "The Poor Rich Guy" 
586: "A Cheater Cheated" 
587: "Bringing Up Dads"
588: "Broken-Armed and Dangerous"
589: "The Impossible"
590: "Three O'Clock Call"
591: "Switch"
592: "Now More Than Ever"
593: "Around the Block"
594: "A Time for Action, Part 1"
595: "A Time for Action, Part 2"

Season 19 (2006–07)
596: "Cover of Darkness"
597: "Out of Our Hands"
598: "My Favorite Thing"
599: "Blood, Sweat, and Fears"
600: "The Nudge"
601: "Bernard and Jeremiah"
602: "Mum's the Word"
603: "The Family Next Door"
604: "Like Father, Like Wooton"
605: "The Chosen One, Part 1"
606: "The Chosen One, Part 2"
607: "The Undeniable Truth"
608: "Run-of-the-Mill Miracle"
609: "Prequels of Love"
610: "Hear Me, Hear Me"
611: "The Top Floor, Part 1"
612: "The Top Floor, Part 2"
613: "The Top Floor, Part 3"
614: "Best of Enemies" 
615: "Only by His Grace"
616: "The Other Side of the Glass, Part 1"
617: "The Other Side of the Glass, Part 2"
618: "The Other Side of the Glass, Part 3"

Season 20 (2007–08)
619: "A New Era, Part 1"
620: "A New Era, Part 2"
621: "A New Era, Part 3"
622: "BTV: Temptation"
623: "Buddy Guard" 
624: "Wooing Wooton"
625: "Something Significant" 
626: "Life, in the Third Person, Part 1"
627: "Life, in the Third Person, Part 2"
628: "The Highest Stakes, Part 1"
629: "The Highest Stakes, Part 2"
630: "Chip Off the Shoulder"
631: "A Capsule Comes to Town" (Title references episode 4, "Connie Comes to Town")
632: "Suspicious Finds" (Title references episode 113, "Suspicious Minds")
633: "A License to Deprive" (Title references episode 194, "A License to Drive")
634: "Accidental Dilemma, Part 1" (Title references episode 8, "Dental Dilemma")
635: "Accidental Dilemma, Part 2" (Title references episode 8, "Dental Dilemma")
636: "A Class Reenactment" (Title references episode 218, "A Class Act")
637: "The Forgotten Deed" (Title references episode 92, "The Ill-Gotten Deed")
638: "The Triangled Web, Part 1" (Title references episode 12, "The Tangled Web")
639: "The Triangled Web, Part 2" (Title references episode 12, "The Tangled Web")
640: "Rights, Wrongs, and Winners" (Title references episode 217, "Rights, Wrongs, and Reasons")
641: "The Imagination Station, Revisited, Part 1"
642: "The Imagination Station, Revisited, Part 2" (Title references episodes 66 and 67, "The Imagination Station," and episodes 251 and 252, "Pilgrim's Progress, Revisited")
643: "Kidsboro, Part 1" (Truth Chronicles episode)
644: "Kidsboro, Part 2" (Truth Chronicles episode)
645: "Kidsboro, Part 3" (Truth Chronicles episode)
TC1: "Here Am I" (Truth Chronicles episode)
TC2: "The Truth Be Told" (Truth Chronicles episode)
TC3: "The Science Club" (Truth Chronicles episode)
TC4: "Three in One" (Truth Chronicles episode)
TC5: "In My Image" (Truth Chronicles episode)
TC6: "Stepping Stones, Part 1" (Truth Chronicles episode)
TC7: "Stepping Stones, Part 2" (Truth Chronicles episode)
TC8: "The Final Call" (Truth Chronicles episode)
???: "BTV: Live!" (This episode was recorded before a live audience at Focus on the Family Headquarters.

Season 21 (2010–11)
655: "The Inspiration Station, Part 1"
656: "The Inspiration Station, Part 2"
657: "Clutter"
658: "Game for a Mystery"
659: "Target of the Week"
660: "For the Birds"
661: "When You're Right, You're Right"
662: "Grandma's Visit"
663: "Finish What You..."
664: "The Jubilee Singers, Part 1"
665: "The Jubilee Singers, Part 2"
666: "The Jubilee Singers, Part 3"
667: "The Mystery Of The Clock Tower, Part 1 "
668: "The Mystery Of The Clock Tower, Part 2 "
669: "Wooton's Broken Pencil Show "
670: "Stage Fright "
671: "Fast As I Can "
672: "Opposite Day "
673: "The Owlnapping "
674: "Square One "
675: "A Thankstaking Story "
676: "An Agreeable Nanny "
677: "The Malted Milk Ball Falcon "
678: "Grandma's Christmas Visit "
679: "The Green Ring Conspiracy, Part 1"
680: "The Green Ring Conspiracy, Part 2"
681: "The Green Ring Conspiracy, Part 3"
682: "The Green Ring Conspiracy, Part 4"
683: "The Green Ring Conspiracy, Part 5"
684: "The Green Ring Conspiracy, Part 6"
685: "The Green Ring Conspiracy, Part 7"
686: "The Green Ring Conspiracy, Part 8"
687: "The Green Ring Conspiracy, Part 9"
688: "The Green Ring Conspiracy, Part 10"
689: "The Green Ring Conspiracy, Part 11"
690: "The Green Ring Conspiracy, Part 12"

Season 22 (2011–12)
691: "Wooton Knows Best"
692: "A Penny Saved"
693: "The Amazing Loser"
694: "Anger Mismanagement"
695: "Forgiving, More or Less"
696: "You're Two Kind"
697: "A Penny Earned"
698: "Never for Nothing"
699: "Emily, the Genius"
700: "How to Sink a Sub"
701: "Unbecoming Jay"
702: "Childish Things"
703: "The Labyrinth, Part 1"
704: "The Labyrinth, Part 2"
705: "The Labyrinth, Part 3"
706: "To Mend or Repair"
707: "Mistaken for Good"
708: "Sergeant York, Part 1"
709: "Sergeant York, Part 2"
710: "Sergeant York, Part 3"
711: "Sergeant York, Part 4"
712: "Child's Play"
713: "Something Old, Something New, Part 1"
714: "Something Old, Something New, Part 2"

Season 23 (2012–13)
715: "The Perfect Church, Part 1"
716: "The Perfect Church, Part 2"
717: "Great Expectations"
718: "For Three Dollars More"
719: "The Bible Network"
720: "Happy Hunting"
721: "The Holy Hoopster"
722: "The Lost Riddle"
723: "Groundhog Jay"
724: "Home Again, Part 1"
725: "Home Again, Part 2"
726: "Push the Red Button"
727: "Your Servant is Listening, Part 1"
728: "Your Servant is Listening, Part 2"
729: "No Chemistry Whatsoever"
730: "The Friend Formula"
731: "More Than A Feeling"
732: "Repent After Me"
733: "Big Trouble Under the Big Top"
734: "Life Expectancy, Part 1"
735: "Life Expectancy, Part 2"
736: "Life Expectancy, Part 3"
737: "The Pilot, Part 1"
738: "The Pilot, Part 2"

Odyssey Adventure Club Season 1 (2014)
739: "The Launch, Pt 1"
740: "The Launch, Pt 2"
741: "In a Kingdom Far Away"
742: "Drake the Cosmic Copper"
743: "Mission: Unaccomplished, Pt 1"
744: "Mission: Unaccomplished, Pt 2"
745: "Like a Good Neighbor"
746: "The Lone Lawman"
747: "Thirty Jays Hath September"
748: "The Perfect Gift"
749: "The Dropbox"
750: "All By Myself"

Season 24 (2014)
751: "The Ties That Bind, Part 1"
752: "The Ties That Bind, Part 2"
753: "The Ties That Bind, Part 3"
754: "The Ties That Bind, Part 4"
755: "The Ties That Bind, Part 5"
756: "The Ties That Bind, Part 6"
757: "The Ties That Bind, Part 7"
758: "The Ties That Bind, Part 8"
759: "The Ties That Bind, Part 9"
760: "The Ties That Bind, Part 10"
761: "The Ties That Bind, Part 11"
762: "The Ties That Bind, Part 12"
763: "The Ties That Bind, Part 13"
764: "The Ties That Bind, Part 14"

Odyssey Adventure Club Season 2 (2015)
765: "Follow Me"
766: "The Cure, Part 1"
767: "The Cure, Part 2"
768: "The Cure, Part 3"
769: "B-TV: To Tell the Truth"
770: "To the Ends of the Earth"
771: "Pinocchio: The Tale of a Foolish Puppet, Part 1"
772: "Pinocchio: The Tale of a Foolish Puppet, Part 2"
773: "Hidden Gems"
774: "Walter's Flying Bus"
775: "Take It on Trust"
776: "A Daughter's Love"

Season 25 (2015)
777: "First Things First"
778: "Playing The Predictable"
779: "A Big Commitment"
780: "Dinner Roll Models"
781: "Out of the Woods"
782: "Let's Get Together"
783: "Words From the Wise"
784: "Cycle of Fear"
785: "No Cause for Concern"
786: "The Case of the Ball Cap Hero"
787: "Between the Lines, Part 1"
788: "Between the Lines, Part 2"

Odyssey Adventure Club Season 3 (2016)
789: "The Journal of John Avery Whittaker"
790: "Walk This Way"
791: "When One Door Closes, Part 1"
792: "When One Door Closes, Part 2"
793: "The Good Soil"
794: "Things Not Seen"
795: "The Boat People, Part 1"
796: "The Boat People, Part 2"
797: "A Predicament of Biblical Proportions"
798: "A Forgiving Heart"
799: "Where Your Treasure Is"
800: "Un-Tech the Halls"

Season 26 (2016–17)
801: "The Feud of Mason County"
802: "Parker for President"
803: "Old Tricks"
804: "The Key Suspect"
805: "A Very Bassett Wedding, Part 1"
806: "A Very Bassett Wedding, Part 2"
807: "Connie the Counselor"
808: "No Friend Like an Old Friend"
809: "Fathers and Sons"
810: "The Grass is Always Greener"
811: "Legacy, Part 1"
812: "Legacy, Part 2"

Adventures in Odyssey Club Season 4 (2017)
813: "One More Name, Part 1"
814: "One More Name, Part 2"
815: "One More Name, Part 3"
816: "A Perfect Testimony"
817: "Unfair Game"
818: "Swept Away, Part 1"
819: "Swept Away, Part 2"
820: "The Legend Of Sperry McGerk"
821: "Angels In Horsehair"
822: "There And Back Again, Part 1"
823: "There And Back Again, Part 2a"
824: "There And Back Again, Part 2b"
825: "There And Back Again, Part 3"

Season 27 (2017–18)
826: "To Find A Penny, Part 1"
827: "To Find A Penny, Part 2"
828: "Friend or Foe"
829: "Have A Heart"
830: "B-TV: Revenge"
831: "Crash Course"
832: "Your Honest Opinion, Please"
833: "The Secret of the Writer's Ruse"
834: "Sir Buddy's Snowy Day"
835: "David and Absalom, Part 1"
836: "David and Absalom, Part 2"
837: "Out of the Picture"

Adventures in Odyssey Club Season 5 (2018)
838: "Rewinding the Big Picture"
839: "Met His Match"
840: "Failing to the Finish Line"
841: "Drake and the Time That Time Forgot"
842: "Mean Streak"
843: "Always Do Your Best-ish"
844: "Charlotte"
845: "Walk Worthy"
846: "The Last Straw"
847: "Beyond Repair"
848: "The New Olivia"
849: "Out to Sea"

Season 28 (2018–19)
850: "The Shame About Fame"
851: "The Sandwich Intitative"
852: "The Toy"
853: "The Good in People"
854: "Not What I Expected"
855: "Divided We Fall"
856: "Much Ado About Jealousy"
857: "Same Mold Story"
858: "B-TV: Trinity"
859: "The Long End, Part 1"
860: "The Long End, Part 2"
861: "The Long End, Part 3"

Adventures in Odyssey Club Season 6 (2019)
862: “In a Sun-Scorched Land, Part 1”
863: “In a Sun-Scorched Land, Part 2”
864: “Between Camp and a Hard Place, Part 1”
865: “Between Camp and a Hard Place, Part 2”
866: “Rumpelstiltskin: A Wee Little Tale”
867: “Take Every Thought Captive”
868: “All for the Guest”
869: “B-TV: Idolatry”
870: “The World of Whitonia”
871: “Icky and Kat and Balty and Bones”
872: “The Morning Star”
873: “Lifted Out of Context”

Season 29 (2019–20)
874: "Rightly Dividing"
875: "Man of the House"
876: "Page From the Playbook"
877: "A Sacrificial Escape"
878: "Nightmares By Constance, Part 1"
879: "Nightmares By Constance, Part 2"
880: “Good Job!”
881: “Playing Favorites”
882: “A Wise Surprise”
883: “Breaking News”
884: “Always Home”
885: “Further from the Truth”

Adventures in Odyssey Club Season 7 (2020)
886: "Unsinkable, Part 1"
887: "Unsinkable, Part 2"
888: "Out of Her Element"
889: "Young Whit and the Revolutionary Secret"
890: "Bridget, Redefined"
891: "Cars, Trains, and Motorcycles"
892: "Millstones"
893: "Badges of Honor"
894: "A Simple Reminder"
895: "The Martyr and the Rooster"
896: "The Forever Gift"
897: "Teach A Man"

Season 30 (2020–21)
898: "The Rydell Revelations, Part 1"
899: "The Rydell Revelations, Part 2"
900: "The Rydell Revelations, Part 3"
901: "For A Song I know"
902: "California Dreams *aka* jules, Part 1"
903: "California Dreams*aka* jules, Part 2"
904: "Jumping Off, Jumping In"
905: "Auto Response"
906: "Unrelatable"
907: "The Protector"
908: "The Christmas Bells"
909: "Let's Call the Whole Thing Off"

Adventures in Odyssey Club Season 8 (2021)
910: If I Never Told You
911: Kopfkino: A Hare, A Hedgehog, and A Doof
912: The Clown Hero
913: Search For A Sunflower
914: Hurricane Perkins
915: The Revenge of Bigfoot
916: Voice of Freedom, Part 1
917: Voice of Freedom, Part 2
918: The Snow Must Go On
919: Sew On and Snow Forth
920: Snow 'Em Who's Boss
921: Make Snow Mistake

Season 31 (2021-22)
922: The Team
923: Please Adjust Your Frequency
924: Higher Than Our Ways
925: Triple-Decker Sundae
926: Set A Watchman
927: Worth It
928: The Lost One, Part 1
929: The Lost One, Part 2
930: Judge Me Tender
931: As Buck Would Have It, Part 1
932: As Buck Would Have It, Part 2
933: As Buck Would Have It, Part 3

Adventures in Odyssey Club Season 9 (2022)
934: A Dickensian Dillemma
935: In For A Penny
936: Drake and the Aberrant Automaton
937: The Way of the Comic Book
938: Knox On Love
939: Results May Vary
940: Fishing For Gold
941: The Honor of Obed Edom
942: The 18-Yard Line
943: Showdown in San Poco
944: A Friend In Need
945: Knox On Sacrifice

Season 32 (2022-23)
946: Morning
947: Afternoon
948: Evening
949: Dead of Night
950: Daybreak
951: Final Minutes
952: Game Night
953: Renee Renewed
954: Legally Wooton
955: Value in the Process
956: Tough Call
957: King of My Heart

Adventures in Odyssey Club Season 10 (2023)
958: Reporting Live from Mount Sinai
959: Dose of Virtual Reality
960: The Jacobs Report: Robert Smalls
961: TBA
962: TBA
963: TBA
964: TBA
965: TBA
966: TBA
967: TBA
968: TBA
969: TBA

Albums
Originally, the first few albums included every episode in chronological order exactly as it aired on the radio. The 3rd album release (#2) would have featured the episodes starting with the 19th episode "Recollections" and ending around the 30th episode "Honor Thy Parents", but it was shelved when the controversy surrounding the character Officer David Harley (voiced by veteran voice actor Will Ryan) occurred. The following album, Grins, Grabbers, and Great Getaways (1988) was then released, continuing where the unreleased album would have left off. After those releases, future albums no longer followed the exact chronological order, and starting with the 5th album release, Daring Deeds, Sinister Schemes (1989), many episodes were often edited to remove references to product promotions and upcoming episodes. The original 1987 four-cassette package containing all the episodes of Family Portraits, the test pilot series, was later phased out, and the 1st album release was re-released several times, first with simply a title change and the same tapes, and in 1992 with all references to the Officer Harley character and Odyssey USA removed.

Family Portraits (1987)
The Lost Episodes (2007)
The Office Harley Collection (2014)
 1: Odyssey USA (1988) / Re-titled Adventures in Odyssey (1989) and later replaced by The Early Classics (1992), presently The Adventure Begins
 2: Grins, Grabbers, and Great Getaways (1988), later "Stormy Weather," presently The Wildest Summer Ever
 3: Secrets, Surprises, and Sensational Stories (1988), presently Heroes
 4: Puns, Parables, and Perilous Predicaments (1989), presently FUN-damentals
 5: Daring Deeds, Sinister Schemes (1989)
 6: Terrific Tales, Mysterious Missions (1990), presently Mission Accomplished
 7: Courageous Characters, Fabulous Friends (1990), presently On Thin Ice
 8: Cunning Capers, Exciting Escapades (1991), presently Beyond Expectations
 9: Amazing Antics, Dynamic Discoveries (1991), presently Just in Time
 10: Other Times . . . Other Places (1991)
 11: It's Another Fine Day . . . (1991)
 12: At Home and Abroad (1992)
 13: It All Started When . . . (1992)
 14: Meanwhile, in Another Part of Town (1992)
 15: A Place of Wonder (1993)
 16: Flights of Imagination (1993)
 17: On Earth as It Is in Heaven (1993)
 18: A Time of Discovery (1994)
 19: Passport to Adventure (1994)
 20: A Journey of Choices (1994)
 21: Wish You Were Here! (1994)
 22: The Changing Times (1995)
 23: Twists and Turns (1995)
 24: Risks and Rewards (1995)
 25: Darkness Before Dawn (1995)
 26: Back on the Air (1996)
 27: The Search for Whit (1996)
 28: Welcome Home (1996)
 29: Signed, Sealed & Committed (1998)
 30: Through Thick & Thin (1998)
 31: Days to Remember (1998)
 32: Hidden Treasures (1998)
 33: Virtual Realities (1999)
 34: In Your Wildest Dreams (2000)
 35: The Big Picture (2001)
 36: Danger Signals (2001)
 37: Countermoves (2002)
 38: Battle Lines (2002)
 39: Friends, Family & Countrymen (2003)
 40: Out of Control (2003)
 41: In Hot Pursuit (2004)
 42: No Way Out (2004)
 43: Along for the Ride (2005)
 44a: A Most Surprising Return (half of Album 44: Eugene Returns!) (2005)
 44b: A Most Amazing Event (half of Album 44: Eugene Returns!) (2005)
 44: Eugene Returns! (2005)
 45a: The Mystery of the Lost Village (half of Album 45: Lost & Found) (2005)
 45b: Odd-itions (half of Album 45: Lost & Found) (2006)
 45: Lost & Found (2006)
 46: A Date with Dad (and Other Calamities) (2006)
 47: Into the Light (2007)
 48: Moment of Truth (2007)
 49: The Sky's the Limit (2008)
 50: The Best Small Town (2008)
The Truth Chronicles (2008)
Passages: Darien's Rise (2009)
 51: Take it From the Top (2010)
 52: Cause and Effect (2010)
 53: The Green Ring Conspiracy (2011)
 54: Clanging Cymbals and the Meaning of God's Love (2011)
 55: The Deep End (2012)
 56: The Grand Design (2012)
 57: A Call to Something More (2013)
 58: The Ties that Bind (2014)
 59: Taking the Plunge (2015)
 60: Head over Heels (2016)
 61: Without A Hitch (2016)
 62: Let's Put on a Show! (2017)
 63: Up in the Air (2017)
 64: Under the Surface (2018)
 65: Expect the Unexpected (2018)
 66: Trial by Fire (2019)
 67: More Than Meets The Eye (2019)
 68: Out of the Blue (2020)
 69: Best Kept Secrets (2020)
 70: Finding A Way (2021)
 71: A Slippery Slope (2021)
 72: The Long Road Home (2022)
 73: 28 Hours (2022)
 74: Buckle Up! (2023)

Episodes by Album
Family Portraits (1987)

 FP01: "Whit's Visitor"
 FP02: "Dental Dilemma"
 FP03: "The New Kid in Town"
 FP04: "No Stupid Questions""
 FP05: "You're Not Gonna Believe This..."
 FP06: "My Brother's Keeper"
 FP07: "While Dad's Away"
 FP08: "The Letter"
 FP09: "A Different Kind of Peer Pressure"
 FP10: "In Memory of Herman"
 FP11: "A Member of the Family, Part 1"
 FP12: "A Member of the Family, Part 2"
 FP13: "A Simple Addition"

The Officer Harley Collection (Adventures in Odyssey Club exclusive) (2014)

 003: "Lights Out at Whit's End"
 009: "Doing Unto Others"
 011: "Addictions Can Be Habit Forming"
 013: "Bobby's Valentine"
 014: "Missed It by That Much"
 021: "The Case of the Missing Train Car"
 023: "The Quality of Mercy"
 024: "Gotcha"
 025: "Harley Takes the Case, Part 1"
 026: "Harley Takes the Case, Part 2"
 070: "The Return of Harley, Part 1"
 071: "The Return of Harley, Part 2"

The Lost Episodes (2002)

 008: "Dental Dilemma"
 015: "My Brother's Keeper"
 016: "No Stupid Questions"
 022: "A Simple Addition"
 030: "Honor Thy Parents"
 044: "It Sure Seems Like It to Me"
 045: "What Are We Gonna Do About Halloween?"
 055: "Auld Lang Syne"
 116: "Isaac the Benevolent"
 117: "The Trouble With Girls"
 134: "Pamela Has a Problem"
 142: "Train Ride"
 161: "Isaac the True Friend"
 435: "A Look Back, Part 1"
 436: "A Look Back, Part 2"
 500: "500"
 501: "Inside the Studio"

1 - The Adventure Begins (1988)

 001: "Whit's Flop"
 002: "The Life of the Party"
 004: "Connie Comes to Town"
 005: "Gifts for Madge & Guy"
 006: "The Day After Christmas"
 007: "Promises, Promises"
 010: "Nothing to Fear"
 012: "The Tangled Web"
 017: "A Member of the Family, Part 1"
 018: "A Member of the Family, Part 2"
 019: "Recollections"
 027: "A Change of Hart"

2 - The Wildest Summer Ever (1988)

 031: "Family Vacation, Part 1"
 032: "Family Vacation, Part 2"
 033: "The Day Independence Came"
 034: "Stormy Weather"
 035: "V.B.S. Blues"
 036: "Kids' Radio"
 037: "Camp What-a-Nut, Part 1"
 038: "Camp What-a-Nut, Part 2"
 039: "The Case of the Secret Room, Part 1"
 040: "The Case of the Secret Room, Part 2"
 041: "Return to the Bible Room"
 042: "The Last Great Adventure of the Summer"

3 - Heroes (1988)

 021: "Mike Makes Right"
 029: "Rumor Has It"
 043: "Back to School"
 046: "The Shepherd and the Giant"
 047: "A Single Vote"
 048: "Heroes"
 049: "Thank You, God"
 050: "Karen"
 051: "Connie, Part 1"
 052: "Connie, Part 2"
 053: "The Sacred Trust"
 054: "Peace on Earth"

4 - FUN-damentals (1989)

 056: "By Faith, Noah"
 057: "The Prodigal, Jimmy"
 058: "A Matter of Obedience"
 059: "A Worker Approved"
 060: "And When You Pray. . ."
 061: "The Boy Who Didn't Go To Church"
 062: "Let This Mind Be in You"
 063: "A Good and Faithful Servant"
 064: "The Greatest of These"
 065: "Bad Company"
 068: "Choices"
 069: "Go Ye Therefore"

5 - Daring Deeds, Sinister Schemes (1989)

 066: "The Imagination Station, Part 1"
 067: "The Imagination Station, Part 2"
 072: "An Encounter with Mrs. Hooper"
 073: "A Bite of Applesauce"
 074: "Connie Goes to Camp, Part 1"
 075: "Connie Goes to Camp, Part 2"
 076: "Eugene's Dilemma"
 077: "The Nemesis, Part 1"
 078: "The Nemesis, Part 2"
 079: "Our Best Vacation Ever"
 083: "The Battle, Part 1"
 084: "The Battle, Part 2"

6 - Mission: Accomplished (1989)

 028: "The Price of Freedom"
 080: "A Prisoner for Christ"
 081: "Good Business"
 082: "Heatwave"
 087: "Elijah, Part 1"
 088: "Elijah, Part 2"
 089: "That's Not Fair!"
 090: "But, You Promised"
 091: "A Mission for Jimmy"
 092: "The Ill-Gotten Deed"
 093: "Rescue from Manatugo Point"
 094: "Operation DigOut"
 102: "The Treasure of LeMonde!"

7 - On Thin Ice (1989)

 086: "Isaac the Insecure"
 095: "The Very Best of Friends"
 096: "The Reluctant Rival"
 097: "Monty's Christmas"
 098: "The Visitors"
 099: "The Barclay Family Ski Vacation"
 100: "Ice Fishing"
 101: "Scattered Seeds"
 103: "Front Page News"
 104: "Lincoln, Part 1"
 105: "Lincoln, Part 2"
 108: "Isaac the Courageous"
 128: "One Bad Apple"
 132: "Thanksgiving at Home"

8 - Beyond Expectations (1990)

 106: "By Any Other Name"
 107: "Bad Luck"
 110: "A...is for Attitude"
 111: "First Love"
 112: "Curious, Isn't It?"
 113: "Suspicious Minds"
 115: "An Act of Mercy"
 120: "Pranks for the Memories"
 121: "Missing Person"
 122: "Castles & Cauldrons, Part 1"
 123: "Castles & Cauldrons, Part 2"
 124: "The Winning Edge"
 125: "All's Well With Boswell"
 138: "The Adventure of the Adventure"

9 - Just In Time (1990)

 109: "Two Sides to Every Story"
 114: "The Big Broadcast"
 118: "What Happened to the Silver Streak?"
 119: "Better Late than Never"
 126: "Wishful Thinking"
 127: "Have You No Selpurcs?"
 129: "Not One of Us"
 130: "Bernard & Joseph, Part 1"
 131: "Bernard & Joseph, Part 2"
 133: "Cousin Albert"
 140: "The Vow"
 141: "Over the Airwaves"
 502: "Live at the 25!"

10 - Other Times, Other Places (1991)

 135: "Back to Bethlehem, Part 1"
 136: "Back to Bethlehem, Part 2"
 137: "Back to Bethlehem, Part 3"
 139: "Melanie's Diary"
 144: "Someone to Watch Over Me"
 145: "The Second Coming"
 146: "Emotional Baggage"
 148: "Isaac the Procrastinator"
 155: "Waylaid in the Windy City, Part 1"
 156: "Waylaid in the Windy City, Part 2"
 157: "Last in a Long Line"
 159: "The Homecoming"

11 - It's Another Fine Day..."

 143: "Muckraker"
 147: "Where There's a Will. . ."
 149: "By Dawn's Early Light"
 150: "Home is Where the Hurt Is"
 151: ". . . The Last Shall Be First"
 152: "The Meaning of Sacrifice"
 153: "Mayor for a Day"
 154: "Coming of Age"
 158: "A Day in the Life"
 160: "A Rathbone of Contention"
 165: "Bernard & Esther, Part 1"
 166: "Bernard & Esther, Part 2"

12 - At Home and Abroad (1991)

 163: "A Model Child"
 168: "The Curse"
 169: "Hold Up!"
 170: "A Test for Robyn"
 171: "The Cross of Cortes, Part 1"
 172: "The Cross of Cortes, Part 2"
 173: "A Thanksgiving Carol"
 174: "Where's Your Daddy?"
 175: "East Winds, Raining"
 176: "The Star, Part 1"
 177: "The Star, Part 2"
 178: "Room Mates"

13 - It All Started When... (1992)

 167: "Dobson Comes to Town"
 179: "You Gotta Be Wise"
 180: "Isaac the Pure"
 181: "It Takes Integrity"
 182: "The Scales of Justice"
 183: "Tales of Moderation"
 184: "Isaac the Chivalrous"
 185: "A Question of Loyalty"
 186: "The Conscientious Cross-Guard"
 187: "An Act of Nobility"
 188: "The Courage to Stand"
 189: "No, Honestly!"
 192: "Modesty is the Best Policy"

14 - Meanwhile, In Another Part of Town (1992)

 162: "Peacemaker"
 164: "Sixties-Something"
 190: "Moses, the Passover, Part 1"
 191: "Moses, the Passover, Part 2"
 193: "A Tongue of Fire"
 194: "A License to Drive"
 195: "Father's Day"
 196: "Harlow Doyle, Private Eye"
 197: "The Midnight Ride"
 198: "Treasure Hunt"
 200: "Feud for Thought"
 202: "Timmy's Cabin"

15 - A Place of Wonder (1992)

 199: "The "No" Factor"
 201: "Fair-Weather Fans"
 203: "Double Trouble"
 204: "Wonderworld"
 205: "Flash Flood"
 206: "Pen Pal"
 207: "The Case of the Candid Camera"
 208: "Pipe Dreams"
 210: "On Solid Ground"
 215: "Caroling, Caroling"
 217: "Rights, Wrongs & Reasons"
 218: "A Class Act"
 223: "Real Time"

16 - Flights of Imagination (1993)

 209: "Columbus: The Grand Voyage"
 211: "The Mortal Coil, Part 1"
 212: "The Mortal Coil, Part 2"
 213: "Best Intentions"
 214: "The Living Nativity"
 216: "Like Father, Like Son"
 219: "Treasures of the Heart"
 220: "This is Chad Pearson?"
 221: "It Is Well"
 226: "An Adventure in Bethany, Part 1"
 227: "An Adventure in Bethany, Part 2"
 228: "A Game of Compassion"

17 - On Earth As It Is In Heaven (1993)

 230: "Our Father"
 231: "Hallowed Be Thy Name"
 232: "Thy Kingdom Come"
 233: "Thy Will Be Done"
 234: "Our Daily Bread"
 235: "Forgive Us as We Forgive"
 236: "Into Temptation"
 237: "Deliver Us From Evil"
 238: "For Thine is the Kingdom"
 239: "The Power"
 240: "And the Glory"
 241: "Forever. . .Amen"

18 - A Time of Discovery (1993)

 222: "The Jesus Cloth"
 224: "Greater Love"
 225: "Count It All Joy"
 229: "The Marriage Feast"
 242: "Hymn Writers"
 243: "Family Values"
 244: "The Mysterious Stranger, Part 1"
 245: "The Mysterious Stranger, Part 2"
 246: "My Fair Bernard"
 247: "Why Don't You Grow Up?"
 248: "Terror from the Skies"
 249: "The Case of the Delinquent Disciples"

19 - Passport To Adventure (1994)

 250: "Pilgrim's Progress Revisited, Part 1"
 251: "Pilgrim's Progress Revisited, Part 2"
 252: "The Bad Hair Day"
 253: "A Time for Christmas"
 254: "Truth, Trivia & 'Trina"
 255: "The Boy Who Cried "Destructo!""
 256: "Aloha, Oy!, Part 1"
 257: "Aloha, Oy!, Part 2"
 258: "Aloha, Oy!, Part 3"
 259: "The Potential in Elliot"
 260: "Naturally, I Assumed"
 262: "A Prayer for George Barclay"

20 - A Journey of Choices (1994)

 261: "Afraid, Not!"
 263: "When Bad Isn't So Good"
 264: "Making the Grade"
 265: "War of the Words"
 266: "It Began with a Rabbit's Foot"
 267: "It Ended with a Handshake"
 268: "Pet Peeves"
 269: "Fences"
 270: "The War Hero"
 271: "The Secret Keys of Discipline"
 272: "Two Brothers and Bernard, Part 1"
 273: "Two Brothers and Bernard, Part 2"

21 - Wish You Were Here (1994)

 274: "First-Hand Experience"
 275: "Second Thoughts"
 276: "Third Degree"
 277: "It Happened at Four Corners"
 278: "The Fifth House on the Left, Part 1"
 279: "The Fifth House on the Left, Part 2"
 280: "Gone . . ."
 281: ". . . But Not Forgotten"
 282: "The Fundamentals"
 283: "A Book by Its Cover"
 284: "The Election Deception"
 288: "The Twilife Zone"

22 - The Changing Times (1995)

 285: "George Under Pressure"
 286: "Tom for Mayor, Part 1"
 287: "Tom for Mayor, Part 2"
 289: "A Call for Reverend Jimmy"
 290: "A Name, Not a Number, Part 1"
 291: "A Name, Not a Number, Part 2"
 292: "Siege at Jericho"
 293: "A Code of Honor"
 294: "Unto Us a Child Is Born"
 295: "Soaplessly Devoted"
 296: "Red Wagons and Pink Flamingos"
 297: "Blackbeard's Treasure"

23 - Twist and Turns (1995)

 298: "I Want My B-TV!"
 299: "The Truth About Zachary"
 300: "Preacher's Kid"
 301: "The Good, the Bad & Butch"
 302: "Share & Share Alike"
 303: "All the Difference in the World"
 304: "Saint Paul: The Man from Tarsus"
 305: "Saint Paul: Set Apart by God"
 306: "A Victim of Circumstance"
 309: "The Perfect Witness, Part 1"
 310: "The Perfect Witness, Part 2"
 311: "The Perfect Witness, Part 3"

24 - Risks and Rewards (1995)

 307: "Poetry in Slow Motion"
 308: "Subject Yourself"
 312: "Rewards in Full"
 313: "Top This!"
 314: "The Underground Railroad, Part 1"
 315: "The Underground Railroad, Part 2"
 316: "The Underground Railroad, Part 3"
 317: "B-TV: Envy"
 318: "A Touch of Healing, Part 1"
 319: "A Touch of Healing, Part 2"
 320: "Where Is Thy Sting?"
 322: "The Turning Point"

25 - Darkness Before Dawn (1995)

 323: "A Little Credit, Please"
 324: "Small Fires, Little Pools"
 325: "Angels Unaware"
 326: "Gathering Thunder"
 327: "Moving Targets"
 328: "Hard Losses"
 329: "The Return"
 330: "The Time Has Come"
 331: "Checkmate"
 332: "Another Chance"
 333: "The Last Resort"
 334: "The Final Conflict"

26 - Back on the Air (1996)

 321: "Hidden In My Heart"
 335: "Love Is in the Air, Part 1"
 336: "Love Is in the Air, Part 2"
 337: "W-O-R-R-Y"
 338: "Easy Money"
 339: "Do, for a Change"
 340: "Pokenberry Falls, R.F.D., Part 1"
 341: "Pokenberry Falls, R.F.D., Part 2"
 342: "Welcome Home, Mr. Blackgaard"
 343: "The Pretty Good Samaritan"
 346: "Saint Paul: Voyage to Rome"
 347: "Saint Paul: An Appointment with Caesar"

27 - The Search For Whit (1996)

 344: "Letting Go"
 345: "B-TV: Compassion"
 348: "With a Little Help from My Friends"
 349: "Blessings in Disguise"
 350: "The Time of Our Lives"
 351: "What Are You Gonna Do with Your Life?"
 352: "Memories of Jerry"
 353: "A Question About Tasha"
 354: "Blind Justice"
 355: "The Search for Whit, Part 1"
 356: "The Search for Whit, Part 2"
 357: "The Search for Whit, Part 3"

28 - Welcome Home (1996)

 358: "The Secret Weapon"
 359: "The Merchant of Odyssey"
 360: "Three Funerals and a Wedding, Part 1"
 361: "Three Funerals and a Wedding, Part 2"
 362: "The Right Choice, Part 1"
 363: "The Right Choice, Part 2"
 364: "Home, Sweet Home"
 365: "Clara"
 366: "Solitary Refinement"
 367: "The Decision"
 368: "The Other Woman"
 369: "It's a Wrap!"

29 - Signed, Sealed & Committed (1997)

 372: "For Whom the Wedding Bells Toll, Part 1"
 373: "For Whom the Wedding Bells Toll, Part 2"
 374: "For Whom the Wedding Bells Toll, Part 3"
 375: "The Pushover"
 376: "Chores No More"
 377: "Just Say Yes"
 378: "The Painting"
 379: "Best Face Forward"
 380: "The One About Trust, Part 1"
 381: "The One About Trust, Part 2"
 382: "Viva La Difference"
 384: "Amazing Grace"

30 - Through Thick & Thin (1997)

 388: "Leap of Faith"
 389: "OT Action News: Jephthah's Vow"
 390: "No Bones About It"
 391: "The Joke's on You"
 392: "When in Doubt...Pray!"
 396: "Poor Loser"
 397: "Tornado!"
 398: "A Case of Revenge"
 399: "Bernard & Job"
 400: "The Spy Who Bugged Me"
 401: "More Like Alicia"
 402: "Arizona Sunrise"

31 - Days To Remember (1998)

 383: "B-TV: Thanks"
 385: "It's a Pokenberry Christmas, Part 1"
 386: "It's a Pokenberry Christmas, Part 2"
 387: "New Years Eve Live!"
 393: "Wrapped Around Your Finger"
 394: "Saint Patrick: A Heart Afire, Part 1"
 395: "Saint Patrick: A Heart Afire, Part 2"
 403: "Faster Than a Speeding Ticket"
 404: "Hide & Seek"
 405: "The Graduate"
 409: "Natural Born Leader"
 412: "A Lesson From Mike"

32 - Hidden Treasures (1998)

 406: "Malachi's Message, Part 1"
 407: "Malachi's Message, Part 2"
 408: "Malachi's Message, Part 3"
 410: "B-TV: Forgiveness"
 411: "In All Things Give Thanks"
 413: "The Devil Made Me Do It"
 414: "Buried Sin"
 415: "Gloobers!"
 416: "The Tower"
 417: "Not-So-Trivial Pursuits"
 420: "Telemachus, Part 1"
 421: "Telemachus, Part 2"

33 - Virtual Realities (1999)

 418: "Opening Day"
 419: "Another Man's Shoes"
 424: "Blackgaard's Revenge, Part 1"
 425: "Blackgaard's Revenge, Part 2"
 426: "The Buck Starts Here"
 427: "Something Cliqued Between Us"
 428: "The Eternal Birthday & Bethany's Imaginary Friend"
 429: "The Y.A.K. Problem"
 430: "Blind Girl's Bluff"
 431: "Where There's Smoke & The Virtual Kid"
 432: "You Win Some, You Lose Some"
 433: "The Treasure Room & Chain Reaction"

34 - In Your Wildest Dreams (2000)

 422: "Passages: Fletcher's Rebellion, Part 1"
 423: "Passages: Fletcher's Rebellion, Part 2"
 437: "Sunset Bowlawater & The Long Way Home"
 438: "The Lyin' Tale & Two Roads"
 440: "I Slap Floor"
 441: "What Do You Think? & Idol Minds"
 443: "Changing Rodney"
 444: "The Bad Guy & Bethany's Flood"
 445: "No Boundaries"
 446: "A Matter of Manners & The Seven Deadly Dwarves"
 447: "Potlucks & Poetry"
 448: "Mandy's Debut"

35 - The Big Picture (2000)

 449: "The Big Deal, Part 1"
 450: "The Big Deal, Part 2"
 451: "Life Trials of the Rich & Famous"
 452: "Missionary Impossible"
 453: "The Great Wishy Woz, Part 1"
 454: "The Great Wishy Woz, Part 2"
 455: "Best Laid Plans"
 456: "Worst Day Ever"
 457: "Opportunity Knocks"
 458: "Red Herring"
 459: "Slumber Party"
 460: "Nova Rising"

36 - Danger Signals (2001)

 462: "The W.E."
 463: "Green Eyes & Yellow Tulips"
 464: "The Triangle, Part 1"
 465: "The Triangle, Part 2"
 466: "Snow Day"
 467: "Broken Window"
 468: "Chains, Part 1"
 469: "Chains, Part 2"
 470: "Break a Leg"
 471: "Fifteen Minutes"
 472: "Welcoming Wooton"
 473: "Breaking Point"

37 - Counter Moves (2002)

 474: "Shining Armor, Part 1"
 475: "Shining Armor, Part 2"
 477: "O. T. Action News: Battle at the Kishon"
 478: "Strange Boy in a Strange Land"
 479: "Happy Smilers"
 481: "Grand Opening, Part 1"
 482: "Grand Opening, Part 2"
 483: "Secrets"
 484: "Plan B, Part 1: Missing in Action"
 485: "Plan B, Part 2: Collision Course"
 486: "Plan B, Part 3: Cross-Fire"
 487: "Plan B, Part 4: Resistance"

38 - Battle Lines (2002)

 488: "Under the Influence, Part 1"
 489: "Under the Influence, Part 2"
 490: "The Black Veil, Part 1"
 491: "The Black Veil, Part 2"
 492: "Twisting Pathway"
 493: "Sheep's Clothing"
 494: "Box of Miracles"
 495: "The Unraveling"
 496: "Exceptional Circumstances"
 497: "Expect the Worst"
 498: "Exactly As Planned"
 499: "Exit"

39 - Friends, Family and Countrymen (2003)

 461: "B-TV: Obedience"
 476: "Relatively Annoying"
 480: "The Popsicle Kid"
 503: "Between You and Me"
 504: "Aubrey's Bathrobe"
 505: "The Toy Man"
 506: "For Trying Out Loud"
 507: "The Benefit of the Doubt"
 508: "The American Revelation, Part 1"
 509: "The American Revelation, Part 2"
 511: "The Pact, Part 1"
 512: "The Pact, Part 2"

40 - Out of Control (2003)

 510: "For the Fun of It"
 514: "Room Enough for Two"
 515: "B-TV: Behind the Scenes"
 516: "Bassett Hounds"
 517: "It's All About Me"
 518: "The Case of the Disappearing Hortons"
 519: "The Defining Moment"
 520: "The Mystery at Tin Flat"
 522: "All Things to All People"
 523: "Here Today, Gone Tomorrow? Part 1"
 524: "Here Today, Gone Tomorrow? Part 2"
 525: "Here Today, Gone Tomorrow? Part 3"

41 - In Hot Pursuit (2003)

 513: "Do or Diet"
 521: "Hindsight"
 526: "Seeing Red"
 527: "Black Clouds"
 528: "The Taming of the Two"
 529: "The Mailman Cometh"
 530: "Silver Lining"
 531: "Teacher's Pest"
 532: "Pink is Not My Color"
 533: "Something Blue, Part 1"
 534: "Something Blue, Part 2"
 537: "My Girl Hallie"

42 - No Way Out (2004)

 535: "Living in the Gray, Part 1"
 536: "Living in the Gray, Part 2"
 538: "Stubborn Streaks"
 539: "Called on in Class"
 540: "The Girl in the Sink"
 541: "Bernard & Saul"
 542: "Eggshells"
 543: "Nothing But the Half Truth"
 544: "Split Ends"
 545: "Something's Got to Change"
 546: "No Way Out, Part 1"
 547: "No Way In, Part 2"

43 - Along For the Ride (2005)

 548: "Sounds Like a Mystery"
 549: "Think on These Things"
 550: "Fairy Tal-e-vision"
 551: "Stars in Our Eyes"
 552: "Sunday Morning Scramble"
 553: "Potential Possibilities"
 554: "Call Me if You Care"
 555: "True Calling"
 556: "And That's the Truth"
 557: "A Lamb's Tale"
 558: "A Glass Darkly"
 559: "The Coolest Dog"

44 - Eugene Returns! (2005)

 560: "The Present Long Ago"
 561: "Lost by a Nose"
 562: "The Last "I Do""
 563: "Tuesdays with Wooton"
 564: "A Most Intriguing Question"
 565: "A Most Surprising Answer"
 566: "A Most Extraordinary Conclusion"
 567: "Two Friends and a Truck"
 568: "The Power of One"
 569: "The Invisible Dog"
 570: "For Better or for Worse, Part 1"
 571: "For Better or for Worse, Part 2"

45 - Lost & Found (2005)

 572: "Odyssey Sings!"
 573: "Back to Abnormal"
 574: "Prisoners of Fear, Part 1"
 575: "Prisoners of Fear, Part 2"
 576: "Prisoners of Fear, Part 3"
 577: "The Business of Busyness"
 578: "All-Star Witness"
 579: "Always"
 580: "Tales of a Small-Town Thug"
 581: "A Christmas Conundrum"
 582: "Silent Night"
 583: "The Champ of the Camp"

46 - A Date with Dad (and Other Calamities) (2006)

 584: "Dead Ends"
 585: "The Poor Rich Guy"
 586: "A Cheater Cheated"
 587: "Bringing Up Dads"
 588: "Broken-Armed and Dangerous"
 589: "The Impossible"
 590: "Three O'Clock Call"
 591: "Switch"
 592: "Now More Than Ever"
 593: "Around the Block"
 594: "A Time for Action, Part 1"
 595: "A Time for Action, Part 2"

47 - Into the Light (2006)

 596: "Cover of Darkness"
 597: "Out of Our Hands"
 598: "My Favorite Thing"
 599: "Blood, Sweat, and Fears"
 600: "The Nudge"
 601: "Bernard & Jeremiah"
 602: "Mum's the Word"
 603: "The Family Next Door"
 604: "Like Father, Like Wooton"
 605: "The Chosen One, Part 1"
 606: "The Chosen One, Part 2"
 607: "The Undeniable Truth"

48 - Moment of Truth (2007)

 434: "B-TV: Redeeming the Season"
 608: "Run-of-the-Mill Miracle"
 609: "Prequels of Love"
 610: "Hear Me, Hear Me"
 611: "The Top Floor, Part 1"
 612: "The Top Floor, Part 2"
 613: "The Top Floor, Part 3"
 614: "Best of Enemies"
 615: "Only By His Grace"
 616: "The Other Side of the Glass, Part 1"
 617: "The Other Side of the Glass, Part 2"
 618: "The Other Side of the Glass, Part 3 "

49 - The Sky's the Limit (2007)

 619: "A New Era, Part 1"
 620: "A New Era, Part 2"
 621: "A New Era, Part 3"
 622: "B-TV: Temptation"
 623: "Buddy Guard"
 624: "Wooing Wooton"
 625: "Something Significant"
 626: "Life, In the Third Person, Part 1"
 627: "Life, In the Third Person, Part 2"
 628: "The Highest Stakes, Part 1"
 629: "The Highest Stakes, Part 2"
 630: "Chip Off the Shoulder"

50 - The Best Small Town (2008)

 631: "A Capsule Comes to Town"
 632: "Suspicious Finds"
 633: "License to Deprive"
 634: "Accidental Dilemma, Part 1"
 635: "Accidental Dilemma, Part 2"
 636: "A Class Reenactment"
 637: "The Forgotten Deed"
 638: "The Triangled Web, Part 1"
 639: "The Triangled Web, Part 2"
 640: "Rights, Wrongs, and Winners"
 641: "The Imagination Station, Revisited, Part 1"
 642: "The Imagination Station, Revisited, Part 2"

The Truth Chronicles (2008)

 643: "Kidsboro, Part 1"
 644: "Kidsboro, Part 2"
 645: "Kidsboro, Part 3"
 TC1: "Here Am I"
 TC2: "The Truth Be Told"
 TC3: "The Science Club"
 TC4: "Three in One"
 TC5: "In My Image"
 TC6: "Stepping Stones, Part 1"
 TC7: "Stepping Stones, Part 2"
 TC8: "The Final Call"

Passages: Darien's Rise (2009)

 646: "Passages: Darien's Rise, Part 1"
 647: "Passages: Darien's Rise, Part 2"
 648: "Passages: Darien's Rise, Part 3"
 649: "Passages: Darien's Rise, Part 4"
 650: "Passages: Darien's Rise, Part 5"
 651: "Passages: Darien's Rise, Part 6"
 652: "Passages: Darien's Rise, Part 7"
 653: "Passages: Darien's Rise, Part 8"
 654: "Passages: Darien's Rise, Part 9"

51 - Take It From the Top (2010)

 655: "The Inspiration Station, Part 1"
 656: "The Inspiration Station, Part 2"
 657: "Clutter"
 658: "Game for a Mystery"
 659: "Target of the Week"
 660: "For the Birds"
 661: "When You're Right, You're Right"
 662: "Grandma's Visit"
 663: "Finish What You..."
 664: "The Jubilee Singers, Part 1"
 665: "The Jubilee Singers, Part 2"
 666: "The Jubilee Singers, Part 3"

52 - Cause and Effect (2010)

 667: "The Mystery of the Clock Tower, Part 1"
 668: "The Mystery of the Clock Tower, Part 2"
 669: "Wooton's Broken Pencil Show"
 670: "Stage Fright"
 671: "Fast as I Can"
 672: "Opposite Day"
 673: "The Owlnapping"
 674: "Square One"
 675: "A Thankstaking Story"
 676: "An Agreeable Nanny"
 677: "The Malted Milkball Falcon"
 678: "Grandma's Christmas Visit "

53 - The Green Ring Conspiracy (2011)

 679: "The Green Ring Conspiracy, Part 1"
 680: "The Green Ring Conspiracy, Part 2"
 681: "The Green Ring Conspiracy, Part 3"
 682: "The Green Ring Conspiracy, Part 4"
 683: "The Green Ring Conspiracy, Part 5"
 684: "The Green Ring Conspiracy, Part 6"
 685: "The Green Ring Conspiracy, Part 7"
 686: "The Green Ring Conspiracy, Part 8"
 687: "The Green Ring Conspiracy, Part 9"
 688: "The Green Ring Conspiracy, Part 10"
 689: "The Green Ring Conspiracy, Part 11"
 690: "The Green Ring Conspiracy, Part 12"

54 - Clanging Cymbals... and the Meaning of God's Love (2011)

 691: "Wooton Knows Best"
 692: "A Penny Saved"
 693: "The Amazing Loser"
 694: "Anger Mismanagement"
 695: "Forgiving More...or Less"
 696: "You're Two Kind"
 697: "A Penny Earned"
 698: "Never for Nothing"
 699: "Emily the Genius"
 700: "How to Sink a Sub"
 701: "Unbecoming Jay"
 702: "Childish Things"

55 - The Deep End (2012)

 703: "The Labyrinth, Part 1"
 704: "The Labyrinth, Part 2"
 705: "The Labyrinth, Part 3"
 706: "To Mend or Repair"
 707: "Mistaken for Good"
 708: "Sergeant York, Part 1"
 709: "Sergeant York, Part 2"
 710: "Sergeant York, Part 3"
 711: "Sergeant York, Part 4"
 712: "Child's Play"
 713: "Something Old, Something New, Part 1"
 714: "Something Old, Something New, Part 2"

56 - The Grand Design (2012)

 715: "The Perfect Church, Part 1"
 716: "The Perfect Church, Part 2"
 717: "Great Expectations"
 718: "For Three Dollars More"
 719: "The Bible Network"
 720: "Happy Hunting"
 721: "The Holy Hoopster"
 722: "The Lost Riddle"
 723: "Groundhog Jay"
 724: "Home Again, Part 1"
 725: "Home Again, Part 2"
 726: "Push the Red Button"

57 - A Call to Something More (2013)

 727: "Your Servant is Listening, Part 1"
 728: "Your Servant is Listening, Part 2"
 729: "No Chemistry Whatsoever"
 730: "The Friend Formula"
 731: "More Than a Feeling"
 732: "Repent After Me"
 733: "Big Trouble Under the Big Top"
 734: "Life Expectancy, Part 1"
 735: "Life Expectancy, Part 2"
 736: "Life Expectancy, Part 3"
 737: "The Pilot, Part 1"
 738: "The Pilot, Part 2"

Odyssey Adventure Club, Season 1 (2014)

 739: "The Launch, Part 1"
 740: "The Launch, Part 2"
 741: "In a Kingdom Far Away"
 742: "Drake the Cosmic Copper"
 743: "Mission: Unaccomplished, Part 1"
 744: "Mission: Unaccomplished, Part 2"
 745: "Like a Good Neighbor"
 746: "The Lone Lawman"
 747: "Thirty Jays Hath September"
 748: "The Perfect Gift"
 749: "The Drop Box"
 750: "All By Myself"

58 - The Ties That Bind (2014)

 751: "The Ties That Bind, Part 1"
 752: "The Ties That Bind, Part 2"
 753: "The Ties That Bind, Part 3"
 754: "The Ties That Bind, Part 4"
 755: "The Ties That Bind, Part 5"
 756: "The Ties That Bind, Part 6"
 757: "The Ties That Bind, Part 7"
 758: "The Ties That Bind, Part 8"
 759: "The Ties That Bind, Part 9"
 760: "The Ties That Bind, Part 10"
 761: "The Ties That Bind, Part 11"
 762: "The Ties That Bind, Part 12"
 763: "The Ties That Bind, Part 13"
 764: "The Ties That Bind, Part 14"

Odyssey Adventure Club, Season 2 (2015)

 765: "Follow Me"
 766: "The Cure, Part 1"
 767: "The Cure, Part 2"
 768: "The Cure, Part 3"
 769: "B-TV: To Tell the Truth"
 770: "To the Ends of the Earth"
 771: "Pinocchio: The Tale of a Foolish Puppet, Part 1"
 772: "Pinocchio: The Tale of a Foolish Puppet, Part 2"
 773: "Hidden Gems"
 774: "Walter's Flying Bus"
 775: "Take It on Trust"
 776: "A Daughter's Love"

59 - Taking the Plunge (2015)

 777: "First Things First"
 778: "Playing the Predictable"
 779: "A Big Commitment"
 780: "Dinner Roll Models"
 781: "Out of the Woods"
 782: "Let's Get Together"

60 - Head Over Heels (2015)

 783: "Words From the Wise"
 784: "Cycle of Fear"
 785: "No Cause for Concern"
 786: "The Case of the Ball Cap Hero"
 787: "Between the Lines, Part 1"
 788: "Between the Lines, Part 2"

Odyssey Adventure Club, Season 3 (2016)

 789: "The Journal of John Avery Whittaker"
 790: "Walk This Way"
 791: "When One Door Closes, Part 1"
 792: "When One Door Closes, Part 2"
 793: "The Good Soil"
 794: "Things Not Seen"
 795: "The Boat People, Part 1"
 796: "The Boat People, Part 2"
 797: "A Predicament of Biblical Proportions"
 798: "A Forgiving Heart"
 799: "Where Your Treasure Is"
 800: "Un-Tech the Halls"

61 - Without a Hitch (2016)

 801: "The Feud of Mason County"
 802: "Parker for President"
 803: "Old Tricks"
 804: "The Key Suspect"
 805: "A Very Bassett Wedding, Part 1"
 806: "A Very Bassett Wedding, Part 2"

62 - Let's Put on a Show (2016)

 807: "Connie the Counselor"
 808: "No Friend Like an Old Friend"
 809: "Fathers and Sons"
 810: "The Grass is Always Greener"
 811: "Legacy, Part 1"
 812: "Legacy, Part 2"

Odyssey Adventure Club, Season 4 (2017)

 813: "One More Name, Part 1"
 814: "One More Name, Part 2"
 815: "One More Name, Part 3"
 816: "A Perfect Testimony"
 817: "Unfair Game"
 818: "Swept Away, Part 1"
 819: "Swept Away, Part 2"
 820: "The Legend of Sperry McGerk"
 821: "Angels in Horsehair"
 822: "There and Back Again, Part 1"
 823: "There and Back Again, Part 2a"
 824: "There and Back Again, Part 2b" 
 825: "There and Back Again, Part 3"

63 - Up in the Air (2017)

 826: "Find a Penny, Part 1"
 827: "Find a Penny, Part 2"
 828: "Friend or Foe"
 829: "Have a Heart"
 830: "B-TV: Revenge"
 831: "Crash Course"

64 - Under the Surface (2017)

 832: "Your Honest Opinion, Please"
 833: "The Secret of the Writer's Ruse"
 834: "Sir Buddy's Snowy Day"
 835: "David and Absalom, Part 1"
 836: "David and Absalom, Part 2"
 837: "Out of the Picture"

Odyssey Adventure Club, Season 5 (2018)

 838: "Rewinding the Big Picture"
 839: "Met His Match"
 840: "Failing to the Finish Line"
 841: "Drake and the Time That Time Forgot"
 842: "Mean Streak"
 843: "Always Do Your Best-ish"
 844: "Charlotte"
 845: "Walk Worthy"
 846: "The Last Straw"
 847: "Beyond Repair"
 848: "The New Olivia"
 849: "Out to Sea"

65 - Expect the Unexpected (2018)

 850: "The Shame About Fame"
 851: "The Sandwich Initiative"
 852: "The Toy"
 853: "The Good in People"
 854: "Not What I Expected"
 855: "Divided We Fall"

66 - Trial by Fire (2018)

 856: "Much Ado About Jealousy"
 857: "Same Mold Story"
 858: "B-TV: Trinity"
 859: "The Long End, Part 1"
 860: "The Long End, Part 2"
 861: "The Long End, Part 3"

Odyssey Adventure Club, Season 6 (2019)

 862: "In A Sun-Scorched Land, Part 1"
 863: "In A Sun-Scorched Land, Part 2"
 864: "Between Camp and a Hard Place, Part 1"
 865: "Between Camp and a Hard Place, Part 2"
 866: "Rumpelstiltskin: A Wee Little Tale"
 867: "Take Every Thought Captive"
 868: "All for the Guest"
 869: "B-TV: Idolatry"
 870: "The World of Whitonia"
 871: "Icky and Kat and Balty and Bones"
 872: "The Morning Star"
 873: "Lifted Out of Context"

67 - More Than Meets the Eye (2019)

 874: "Rightly Dividing"
 875: "Man of the House"
 876: "Page From the Playbook"
 877: "A Sacrificial Escape"
 878: "Nightmares By Constance, Part 1"
 879: "Nightmares By Constance, Part 2"

68 - Out of the Blue (2019)
880: "Good Job!"
881: "Playing Favorites"
882: "A Wise Surprise"
883: "Breaking News"
884: "Always Home"
885: "Further from the Truth"

Odyssey Adventure Club, Season 7 (2020)
886: "Unsinkable, Part 1"
887: "Unsinkable, Part 2"
888: "Out of Her Element"
889: "Young Whit and the Revolutionary Secret"
890: "Bridget, Redefined"
891: "Cars, Trains, and Motorcycles"
892: "Millstones"
893: "Badges of Honor"
894: "A Simple Reminder"
895: "The Martyr and the Rooster"
896: "The Forever Gift"
897: "Teach A Man"

69 - Best Kept Secrets (2020)
898: "The Rydell Revelations, Part 1"
899: "The Rydell Revelations, Part 2"
900: "The Rydell Revelations, Part 3"
901: "For A Song"
902: "California Dreams, Part 1"
903: "California Dreams, Part 2"

70 - Finding A Way (2021)
904: "Jumping Off, Jumping In"
905: "Auto Response"
906: "Unrelatable"
907: "The Protector"
908: "The Christmas Bells"
909: "Let's Call the Whole Thing Off"

Odyssey Adventure Club, Season 8 (2021)
910: "If I Never Told You"
911: "Kopfkino: A Hare, A Hedgehog, and a Doof"
912: "The Clown Hero"
913: "Search For A Sunflower"
914: "Hurricane Perkins"
915: "The Revenge of Bigfoot"
916: "Voice of Freedom, Part 1"
917: "Voice of Freedom, Part 2"
918: "The Snow Must Go On"
919: "Sew On and Snow Forth"
920: "Snow 'Em Who's Boss"
921: "Make Snow Mistake"

71 - A Slippery Slope (2021)
922: "The Team"
923: "Please Adjust Your Frequency"
924: "Higher Than Our Ways
925: "Triple-Decker Sundae"
926: "Set A Watchman"
927: "Worth It"

72 - The Long Road Home (2022)
928: "The Lost One, Part 1"
929: "The Lost One, Part 2"
930: "Judge Me Tender"
931: "As Buck Would Have It, Part 1"
932: "As Buck Would Have It, Part 2"
933: "As Buck Would Have It, Part 3"

Odyssey Adventure Club, Season 9 (2022)
934: "A Dickensian Dillemma"
935: "In For A Penny"
936: "Drake and the Aberrant Automaton"
937: "The Way of the Comic Book"
938: "Knox On Love"
939: "Results May Vary"
940: "Fishing For Gold"
941: "The Honor of Obed Edom"
942: "The 18-Yard Line"
943: "Showdown in San Poco"
944: "A Friend in Need"
945: "Knox On Sacrifice"

73 - 28 Hours (2022)
946: Morning
947: Afternoon
948: Evening
949: Dead of Night
950: Daybreak
951: Final Minutes

74 - Buckle Up! (2023)
952: Game Night
953: Renee Renewed
954: Legally Wooton
955: Value in the Process
956: Tough Call
957: King of My Heart

Odyssey Adventure Club, Season 10 (2023)
958: Reporting Live From Mount Sinai
959: Dose of Virtual Reality
960: The Jacobs Report: Robert Smalls
961: TBA
962: TBA
963: TBA
964: TBA
965: TBA
966: TBA
967: TBA
968: TBA
969: TBA

Unreleased episodes

 085: "You Go to School Where?"
 370: "Christmas Around the World, Part 1"
 371: "Christmas Around the World, Part 2"
 438b: "The Telltale Cat"
 439: "BTV: Grace"
 442b: "Sticks and Stones"
 444a: "Career Moves"

Gold Audio Series 
a first 15 albums were originally released on audio cassette tape only. Starting in 2003, Focus on the Family updated and re-released those albums as part of the Gold Audio series. In the process, these albums, which were digitally remastered, were released on compact disc for the first time. Not only did these releases contained remastered episodes, but they also contained behind-the-scenes material from the cast and crew as bonus features. In addition, a ll number of episodes that never appeared in the original cassette albums made their debut in the discs.

As mentioned above, all episodes that originally contained Officer Harley have been replaced with edited versions of the original episodes or with other unrelated episodes, carrying over the changes first made in The Early Classics when it was released in 1992. The openings to many episodes have been removed or replaced, sometimes with newly recorded openings with Whit voiced by Paul Herlinger rather than Hal Smith. Other changes include the reordering of the episodes (or, in the case of albums 12 and 13, entire albums) to make the chronological listening experience more accurate, and the removal of references to cassettes at the end of multi-part episodes (e.g., "For the rest of the adventure, please turn over the tape."). The changes are most noticeable in the chronologically earliest albums, while albums 8 onwards feature comparatively fewer changes. Most albums were also renamed, by suggestions from listeners as well other means. Re-releases of these albums have dropped the Gold Audio label.

The sixteenth album, The Lost Episodes, contained an additional 100 episodes that were not included in any of the other Gold Audio releases. Most of these episodes were previously available as individual cassettes from Focus on the Family.

0: The Lost Episodes CD
1: The Adventure Begins: The Early Classics AC CD
2: Stormy Weather: and Other Grins, Grabbers & Great Getaways CD
3: Heroes: and Other Secrets, Surprises and Sensational Stories CD
4: FUN-damentals: Puns, Parables and Perilous Predicaments CD
5: Daring Deeds, Sinister Schemes CD
6: Mission: Accomplished CD
7: On Thin Ice CD
8: Beyond Expectations CD
9: Just in Time CD
10: Other Times . . . Other Places CD
11: It's Another Fine Day . . .  CD
12: At Home and Abroad CD
13: It All Started When . . .  CD
14: Meanwhile, In Another Part of Town
15: A Place of Wonder

Thematic albums
 Classics 1: Welcome to Odyssey AC CD
 Classics 2: A Maze of Mysteries
 Classics 3: Bible Eyewitness: Old Testament
 Classics 4: Bible Eyewitness: New Testament
 Classics 5: Comic Belief
 Classics 6: Star-Spangled Stories of American History
 Classics 7: Drive Time
 Chronicles, Kings & Crosses
 Passages: Fletcher's Rebellion
 Passages: Darien's Rise (2009)
 The Truth Chronicles (2009)
 More than Sundays
 Good Grief: God's Love in the Midst of Sorrow
 Christmas Classics
  AIO Life Lessons #1: Courage
  AIO Life Lessons #2: Humility
  AIO Life Lessons #3: Compassion
  AIO Life Lessons #4: Diligence
  AIO Life Lessons #5: Peer Pressure
  AIO Life Lessons #6: Perseverance
  AIO Life Lessons #7: Honesty
  AIO Life Lessons #8: Friendship
  AIO Life Lessons #9: Citizenship
  AIO Life Lessons #10: Excellence
  AIO Life Lessons #11: Respect
  AIO Life Lessons #12: Responsibility
 Eugene Sings!
 Eugene Sings! Christmas
 My Favorite Adventures

Videos 
AIO released a series of animated videos starting on September 24, 1991, and ending on June 3, 2003.  Each are now available on both VHS and DVD formats, in English and Spanish.

Original Series (1991-1998)

The New Series (2000-2003)
The opening credit has been changed while the end credit remain the same for episodes 1, 2 and 4.

Merchandise

Activity Packs 
1: "I Want My BTV!"
2: "The Harlow Doyle Mystery Files"
3: "Lazarus, Come Forth!"
4: "Waylaid in the Windy City"
5: "Look Out, Lincoln"
6: "The Cross of Cortes"
7: "Family Vacation"
8: "Bernard and the Coat of Many Colors"
9: "A Thanksgiving Carol"
10: "The Star"
11: "Roll Away the Stone"
12: "Aloha, Oy!"
13: "Connie Goes to Camp"

Games 
 At Whit's End
 The Imagination S

DVD Games 
 Answer That! - "Adventures in Odyssey" Edition

Computer programs 
1. Adventures in Odyssey 3-D CD-ROM
2. Adventures in Odyssey Print Crafter Plus
3. Adventures in Odyssey and the Sword of the Spirit
4. Adventures in Odyssey and the Treasure of the Incas
5. Adventures in Odyssey and the Great Escape

See also 
 Adventures in Odyssey
 List of Adventures in Odyssey characters

References

External links 
 OdysseyScoop.com Episode Guide
 AIOwiki Episode Guide
Whits End:On The Radio Vault

Adventures in Odyssey
Adventures in Odyssey